The 2020 Northern Ontario Men's Provincial Curling Championship, the men's curling championship of Northern Ontario was held from January 29 to February 2 at the Don Shepherdson Memorial Arena in New Liskeard. The winning Brad Jacobs rink represented Northern Ontario at the 2020 Tim Hortons Brier in Kingston, Ontario and finished in fourth place. The event was held in conjunction with the 2020 Northern Ontario Scotties Tournament of Hearts, the Northern Ontario women's curling championship. In the final, Team Jacobs defeated Team Badiuk 7–3 and will represent Northern Ontario at the Tim Hortons Brier for a twelfth time.

Teams
Teams are as follows:

Round-robin standings
Final round-robin standings

Round-robin results
All draws are listed in Eastern Time.

Draw 1
Wednesday, January 29, 1:30 pm

Draw 2
Wednesday, January 29, 8:00 pm

Draw 3
Thursday, January 30, 10:00 am

Draw 4
Thursday, January 30, 2:30 pm

Draw 5
Thursday, January 30, 7:30 pm

Draw 6
Friday, January 31, 9:30 am

Draw 7
Friday, January 31, 2:30 pm

Draw 8
Friday, January 31, 7:30 pm

Draw 9
Saturday, February 1, 9:30 am

Draw 10
Saturday, February 1, 2:30 pm

Tiebreaker
Saturday, February 1, 7:30 pm

Playoffs

Semifinal
Sunday, February 2, 9:30 am

Final
Sunday, February 2, 1:30 pm

References

2020 Tim Hortons Brier
Curling in Northern Ontario
Northern Ontario Men's Provincial Curling Championship
Northern Ontario Men's Provincial Curling Championship
Northern Ontario Men's Provincial Curling Championshipl
Temiskaming Shores
Curling competitions in Ontario